The tomb of Jesse and Ruth is an ancient structure located within the ruin of Deir Al Arba'een in the Tel Rumeida section of Hebron that Jewish tradition considers to be the tomb of Jesse and Ruth. The place is in area H2 of Hebron, under Israeli control. 

A small synagogue in the room adjacent to the tomb receives visitors throughout the year, especially on the Jewish holiday of Shavuot, in which the Book of Ruth is read.

Historical references

Mamluk period
One of the earliest known references to the tomb comes from an unnamed student of the Ramban who visited the site between 1289 and 1290. He wrote of visiting the "cave of Jesse's grave" on a hilltop near the Cave of Machpela and the ancient Jewish Cemetery of Hebron.

The Jewish traveller Yaakov HaShaliach mentions visiting the grave of Jesse, father of David in Hebron in the year 1235, but he does not specify the burial place.

Rabbi Ovadia of Bertinoro (1445-1515) mentions praying there in his travel writings.

Ottoman period
In 1522, Rabbi Moses ben Mordecai Bassola wrote, "at the summit of the mountain opposite Hebron is the burial place of Jesse, David's father. It has a handsome building with a small window that looks down on the burial cave. They say that once they threw a cat through the window and it emerged from the hole in the Cave of the Patriarchs. The distance between them is half a mile."
Yihus HaAvos V'Neviim (Lineage of the Patriarch and the Prophets), a book from 1537 refers to the site as "a handsome building up on the mount, where Jesse, the King David's father is buried." It includes a drawing of the site, and notes an "ancient Israelite burial ground" nearby and Crusader courtyard.

Two Karaite travellers wrote of the site: Samuel ben David of Crimea in 1642 and Benjamin Ben-Eliyahu in 1785.
The first known written reference to the site housing the tomb of both Jesse and Ruth comes from the 1835 book Love of Jerusalem  by Haim Horwitz, referencing local oral traditions. 

Menachem Mendel of Kamenitz wrote in 1839,"Here I write of the graves of the righteous to which I paid my respects. Hebron – Described above is the character and order of behavior of those coming to pray at the Cave of ha-Machpelah. I went there, between the stores, over the grave of Abner ben Ner and was required to pay a Yishmaeli – the grave was in his courtyard – to allow me to enter. Outside of the city I went to the grave of Othniel ben Kenaz and, next to him, are laid to rest 9 students in niches in the wall of a shelter standing in a vineyard. I gave 20 pa’res to the owner of the vineyard. Also in the vineyard was a shelter with 2 graves: one of Jesse, father of David, and one of Ruth, the Moabite. I gave the vineyard owner 20 pa’res. I also went to a grave said to be that of the Righteous Rav, author of Reshit Hokhma."

British Mandate period
Louis-Hugues Vincent (1872-1960), a French monk and archaeologist who lived in Jerusalem, discusses the site in his two-volume work Hebron in 1923.

In 1935, Zev Vilnay wrote that visitors were required to pay to access the site, and that it once connected to the Tomb of Machpela but was filled in during the First World War and the entrance was now unknown.

Archaeologist Jacob Pinkerfield (1897–1956) visited the site and wrote about it in his 1945/46 book The Synagogues in Eretz Yisra'el.

Post-1967 period
In the 1970s, Prof. Ben Zion Tavger (1930 - 1983) excavated the site, and it was reopened to the public.

The site was renovated in 2009.

References

Further reading
 

Book of Ruth
Jesse and Ruth
Buildings and structures in Hebron
Synagogues in the West Bank
Tombs in the State of Palestine